John Bland (born c. 1967) is an American football coach. He is the head football coach at Mississippi College, a position he had held since 2014.  Bland served as the head football coach at Southern Arkansas University in 2000 and at the University of the Cumberlands in Williamsburg, Kentucky from 2005 to 2013.  Bland played college football as a quarterback at the University of Arkansas from 1988 to 1991.  He worked as the quarterbacks coach at Rice University from 2001 to 2005.

Head coaching record

References

External links
 Mississippi College profile

Year of birth missing (living people)
1960s births
Living people
American football quarterbacks
Arkansas Razorbacks football players
Cumberlands Patriots football coaches
Mississippi College Choctaws football coaches
Rice Owls football coaches
Southern Arkansas Muleriders football coaches
High school football coaches in Tennessee
Sportspeople from Knoxville, Tennessee
Players of American football from Knoxville, Tennessee